is a Brazilian former professional baseball first baseman who played for the Tokyo Yakult Swallows in Nippon Professional Baseball.

He was born in São Paulo, in 1980. He joined the Yakult Swallows in 1999, and acquired Japanese nationality in 2004.

He represented Brazil at the 2002 Intercontinental Cup and 2013 World Baseball Classic.

References

External links

1980 births
Living people
Brazilian baseball players
Brazilian people of Japanese descent
Japanese baseball players
Yakult Swallows players
Tokyo Yakult Swallows players
2013 World Baseball Classic players
Japanese people of Brazilian descent
Sportspeople from São Paulo (state)
Naturalized citizens of Japan
Nippon Professional Baseball outfielders
Nippon Professional Baseball coaches